Catharina Isabella "Ien" Dales (18 October 1931 – 10 January 1994) was a Dutch politician and social worker. Born in Arnhem, she received a degree in education from the University of Amsterdam and worked in social services before her career in politics. She became a member of the Labour Party (PvdA) in 1968 and was appointed State Secretary for Social Affairs and Employment in the Van Agt II cabinet, a position that she held between 1981 and 1982. Dales was a member of the House of Representatives between 1981 and 1987 and mayor of Nijmegen between 1987 and 1989. She was the Minister of the Interior in the Lubbers III cabinet from 1989 and 1994.

Early life 
Dales was born on 18 October 1931 in Arnhem, Netherlands. She attended the Kerk en Wereld Academy in Driebergen, where she received a diploma in theology and preaching, and received a degree in education from the University of Amsterdam in 1975. She worked for the Church and World Organisation between 1956 and 1974, being originally a course teacher, before becoming the deputy head and head of the education department and director of the organisation. She worked as a freelance researcher between 1 January 1975 until 1 September 1977. Dales was director of the social services for the municipality of Rotterdam between 1 September 1977 and 11 September 1981.

Political career 
Dales joined the Labour Party (PvdA) in 1968. Following the 1981 general election, she was appointed as the State Secretary for Social Affairs and Employment in the Van Agt II cabinet, taking office on 11 September 1981, with special responsibility for social security. The Van Agt II cabinet dissolved just seven months into its term on 12 May 1982 and continued to serve in a demissionary capacity until it was replaced by the caretaker Van Agt III cabinet on 29 May 1982.

Dales was elected as a member of the House of Representatives after the 1982 general election, taking office on 16 September 1982. She was the chair of the committee on petitions and the committee on the police. She held this position until 16 May 1987, the day that she took office as the mayor of Nijmegen. She was mayor until 7 November 1989. After the 1989 general election, Dales was appointed as the Minister of the Interior in the Lubbers III cabinet, taking office on 7 November 1989. She held this position until 10 January 1994.

Death and legacy 
Dales died on 10 January 1994 in Utrecht. She was the second known LGBT government minister in the Netherlands. She was in a relationship with fellow Labour Party politician Elizabeth Schmitz. For many years this fact was an open secret in Dutch politics at that time.

Decorations

References

External links
 

1931 births
1994 deaths
Dutch members of the Dutch Reformed Church
Dutch social workers
Female interior ministers
Knights of the Order of the Netherlands Lion
Labour Party (Netherlands) politicians
Bisexual politicians
LGBT cabinet members of the Netherlands
LGBT Calvinist and Reformed Christians
LGBT mayors of places in the Netherlands
LGBT members of the Parliament of the Netherlands
Mayors of Nijmegen
Members of the House of Representatives (Netherlands)
Ministers of the Interior of the Netherlands
People from Arnhem
Politicians from Rotterdam
Politicians from Utrecht (city)
State Secretaries for Social Affairs of the Netherlands
University of Amsterdam alumni
Women government ministers of the Netherlands
Women mayors of places in the Netherlands
Social workers
20th-century Dutch civil servants
20th-century Dutch women politicians
20th-century Dutch politicians
20th-century Dutch LGBT people